U.S. Route 62 (US 62) is a US highway that runs from the Mexico–US border at El Paso, TX to the Canada-US border at Niagara Falls, NY. In Texas, the highway exists in two segments separated by a segment in New Mexico. US 62 is a major corridor in West Texas as it connects the cities of El Paso and Lubbock.

Route description

Trans-Pecos
US 62 begins at the Santa Fe Street Bridge at the Mexico–US border in El Paso concurrent with U.S. Route 85. US 62 ends its overlap with US 85 and runs along E. Paisano Drive through Downtown El Paso. The highway runs northeast and passes by the Chamizal National Memorial before interchanging with Interstate 110 and U.S. Route 54. US 62 continues to run along E. Paisano Drive and has a short overlap with State Highway 20, which both enters and leaves via a traffic circle. The highway meets Interstate 10, where it begins an overlap with U.S. Route 180. Just north of I-10, US 62/180 leave E. Paisano Drive and begin to run along Montana Avenue, passing just south of El Paso International Airport. The section of Montana Avenue from Global Reach Drive/N. Yarbrough Drive to Rich Beem Boulevard runs along the reservation line to Fort Bliss. Development begins to steadily decrease along the highway east of Loop 375 as US 62 runs through the communities of Homestead Meadows North/Homestead Meadows South, Butterfield, and Montana Vista. After leaving El Paso County, the highway runs through sparsely populated areas and the town of Pine Springs near Guadalupe Mountains National Park. The highway winds through the Guadalupe Mountains before crossing into New Mexico.

South Plains
US 62/180 reenters Texas from New Mexico between Hobbs and Seminole. US 62 ends its overlap with US 180 in Seminole and begins an overlap with U.S. Route 385. The two highways run north-northeast through the towns of Seagraves and Wellman before entering Brownfield. In Brownfield, US 62 has a short overlap with U.S. Route 380 and State Highway 137 and begins an overlap with U.S. Route 82. US 385 leaves the concurrency in the northern part of the town. US 62/82 run through the towns of Meadow and Ropesville before entering metro Lubbock and the town of Wolfforth. The highway bypasses the town as a freeway and enters Lubbock near the 82nd Street exit. US 62/82 becomes a divided highway between 82nd Street and Spur 327 before becoming a freeway again, which is known locally as the Marsha Sharp Freeway. US 62 runs along the Marsha Sharp Freeway through a heavily developed area of southwest Lubbock before leaving US 82 at State Highway 114. US 62/SH 114 run through the heart of the city on 19th Street before becoming Idalou Road at Martin Luther King, Jr. Boulevard. The highway rejoins US 82 near the East Loop 289 interchange. The highways run northeast out of the city before turning in a predominantly east direction in Idalou. 

US 62 leaves US 82/SH 114 in Ralls before beginning a concurrency with State Highway 207. The highway's concurrency with SH 207 ends in Floydada, with US 62 beginning an overlap with U.S. Route 70. US 62 has a lengthy overlap with US 70 that lasts from Floydada to Paducah. In Paducah, US 62 begins an overlap with U.S. Route 83, with the two highways running through Childress. US 62 ends its overlap with US 83 just north of the Prairie Dog Town Fork Red River and exits the state into Oklahoma a few miles west of Hollis.

Junction list

References

Transportation in Childress County, Texas
Transportation in Cottle County, Texas
Transportation in Crosby County, Texas
Transportation in Culberson County, Texas
Transportation in El Paso County, Texas
Transportation in El Paso, Texas
Transportation in Floyd County, Texas
Transportation in Gaines County, Texas
Transportation in Hockley County, Texas
Transportation in Hudspeth County, Texas
Transportation in Lubbock County, Texas
Transportation in Lubbock, Texas
Transportation in Motley County, Texas
Transportation in Terry County, Texas
 Texas
62